Primavera Online School is a publicly funded charter school serving grades K–12 in Arizona. The school was founded in 2001 by Damian Creamer and was made possible by a program established by the Arizona Legislature in 1998. Primavera targets students at risk of not graduating from conventional high schools, estimating that 70% of their students are high risk. In 2018 Primavera was ranked the #2 charter school in Arizona. Primavera added grades K-5 in partnership with Sequoia Choice for the 2020/2021 school year.

Structure 
Primavera Online School is accredited by Cognia (formerly AdvancED.) There are no fees for students aged 14–22, and only students 22 or younger are accepted. Two types of students attend Primavera: full-time and concurrent-enrolled. Primavera offers two types of diplomas.  The standard diploma requires 22 credits while the advanced scholastic diploma requires 23 credits and has a stronger emphasis on math, science, and foreign languages.

Primavera has open enrollment throughout the year, and offers block scheduling. Students take two courses for each six-week block. Each course equals one credit. All teachers are certified and are required to stay in constant contact with each student throughout the course.

Primavera claims a student-to-teacher ratio of 33:1, although records at the Arizona Department of Education indicate 68:1.

Results 
In 2017–18, there were 21,782 students enrolled in grades six through 12. In 2017's state standardized tests, under a quarter of its students passed mathematics and around a third passed English, both below the state average.

The school had the third-highest drop out rate in Arizona in 2017, with 49% dropping out; around 10 times the state average.

Finances 
Primavera, like other charter schools in Arizona, is publicly funded per pupil, although at a reduced rate due to being online-only.

Primavera opened in 2001 under the management of Primavera Technical Learning Center, a nonprofit charter management organization. In 2015, the school's charter was transferred to for-profit education management organization Flipswitch and its subsidiary, American Virtual Academy, Inc. Flipswitch was renamed Strongmind.  It has one shareholder, Damian Creamer.

Creamer has been criticized for using this funding structure to pay himself an $8.8 million yearly salary and making large payments to other companies he owns. The school has also been criticized for teacher salaries and diverting educating funding to a for-profit investment portfolio, worth $36 million in 2015.

References

External links
 

Charter schools in Arizona
Schools in Maricopa County, Arizona
Public high schools in Arizona
Online schools in the United States
2001 establishments in Arizona
Educational institutions established in 2001